Nuria Calderón García-Botey (born 8 March 1977), known professionally as Nuria C. Botey, is a Spanish fantasy, science fiction, and horror writer.

Biography
Nuria C. Botey holds a doctorate in Social Psychology from the Complutense University of Madrid, a master's degree in Communication and Social Skills for Intervention in Groups from the University of Seville, and has worked as a professor of university studies in Psychology. She has been a member of the Madrid Tertulia of Fantasy Literature (TerMa), of the Spanish Horror Writers Association (Nocte), and of the literary group La Hermandad Poe, coordinated by poet . She has also written children's literature and erotic novels on LGBT topics, under the pseudonym Pablo Castro.

Work
She is the author of the micro fiction book Circo de Pulgas (2011), later published as Mosquitos en tu alcoba (2014), and the story anthology Vosotros justificáis mi existencia (2012), later Nunca beses a un extraño (2016), for which she received the Nocte Award in 2013. In 2017 she published the novel Plata pura, un lobo hombre en Madrid.

She also participated in the children's story anthology Los terroríficos cuentos de Raxnarín, a solidarity initiative to support integration projects for children affected by spina bifida. Her story "La evolución de la especies" has been translated into French by Marie-Anne Cleden in the anthology Monstres! As Pablo Castro, she has published two erotic novels: Los chicos de la Costa Azul (2007) and Hollywood Life (2008).

Awards and recognitions
In 1993, at age 16, Botey won her first award: Alfaguara's Los Nuevos Prize, with her story "Una auténtica pena". The following year, she won the 17th Clarín Short Story Award with "Vosotros justificáis mi existencia", included in the compilation of the same name which won the 2013 Nocte Award for Best National Story Anthology.

In 2014, she was recognized by Ultratumba magazine for the best story appearing in the anthology Anatomías Secretas. "Suburbano" won fourth place in the 4th Solidaridad Obrera "Un metro de 350 palabras" Short Story Prize in 2006. "Taquillera" also won the second prize in the award's 6th edition in 2008.

References

External links
 

1977 births
Complutense University of Madrid alumni
Horror writers
Living people
21st-century Spanish women writers
Pseudonymous women writers
Spanish fantasy writers
Spanish science fiction writers
Spanish women short story writers
Spanish short story writers
University of Seville alumni
Women horror writers
Writers from Madrid
21st-century pseudonymous writers